Shelby Flint (born September 17, 1939) is an American singer-songwriter who had two top-100 hits, "Angel on My Shoulder" in 1961 and "Cast Your Fate to the Wind" in 1966.

Career
Flint's single "I Will Love You" appeared in the Variety T.I.P.S. (Tune Index of Performance and Sales) Top 100 in 1961. She has been a singer in several movies including Breezy ("Breezy's Song"); Snoopy, Come Home ("Do You Remember Me?" (Lila's Theme)); and Disney's The Rescuers. Among the songs she performed for The Rescuers, "Someone's Waiting for You" was nominated for the Academy Award for Best Original Song in 1977.

In an April 1995 interview Joni Mitchell recalled that when she began making the rounds of the folk open mic circuit she wanted to sound just like Shelby Flint.

Personal life
Flint was born in North Hollywood, California, United States.  She attended public schools in Van Nuys, California, including Valerio Street Elementary, Robert Fulton Junior High School, and Birmingham High School, where she graduated in 1957.

Singles discography

References

External links

1939 births
Living people
American women pop singers
American voice actresses
People from Greater Los Angeles
21st-century American women